Circle House is a South Korean television healing talk show that aired every Thursday at 21:00 (KST) on SBS TV from February 24 to April 28, 2022.

Overview

Circle House is a new year special program by SBS, which premiered on Thursday, February 24, 2022. The program is a healing talk show that frankly shares the common distress experienced by the MZ generation in Korea, and explores solutions together with applicants. The warmth and fun brought by the "magic combination" is anticipated to soothe the minds of the frustrated and exhausted youth living in the hustle and bustle.

Cast

Ratings

References

External links
  
 Circle House at Naver 

South Korean variety television shows
Korean-language television shows
2022 South Korean television series debuts
2022 South Korean television series endings
Seoul Broadcasting System original programming